Vecchiano is a comune (municipality) in the Province of Pisa in the Italian region Tuscany, located about  west of Florence and about  north of Pisa. It is home to a castle, known as Gaetani or Lanfranchi castle, or as the hermitage of Santa Maria in Castello, which overlooks the town and the nearby plan.

Vecchiano borders the following municipalities: Lucca, Massarosa, San Giuliano Terme, Viareggio.

References

External links

 Official website

Cities and towns in Tuscany